The Indian state of Telangana was founded in 2014. Its territory had formerly been part of Andhra Pradesh. The Telangana movement was instrumental in the creation of the new state, and Telangana Rashtra Samithi, a party which led the Telangana movement after 2001, forms the government in the Telangana Legislative Assembly under Chief Minister K. Chandrashekar Rao.

Telangana movement 

In the early Telangana movement, Marri Chenna Reddy formed a party called Telangana Praja Samiti to lead the Telangana movement. In November 1969, there was a major split in the party and as a result the movement declined. After two years the Telangana Praja Samiti was dissolved and its members rejoined the Congress.

A successor party, Telangana Rashtra Samithi, was formed in 2001 by Kalvakuntla Chandrashekar Rao. On 29 November 2009, Chandrashekar Rao started a fast-unto-death, demanding that the Congress party introduce a Telangana bill in Parliament. Student organisations, employee unions, and various organisations joined the movement. As general strikes shut down much economic activity in Telangana, Telangana Bill was passed in  Lok Sabha on 18 February 2014 and in Rajya Sabha on 18 February 2014 with the support of the BJP. On 4 March 2014 the Government of India declared that 2 June would be the Telangana Formation Day.

Elections 
The 2014 Andhra Pradesh Legislative Assembly election was held in united Andhra Pradesh state shortly before the formation of Telangana, on 30 April 2014. The results were declared on 16 May 2014, with Telangana Rashtra Samithi having won an overall majority within Telangana. This party went on to lead the first Government of Telangana when the Telangana Legislative Assembly was established, and won an increased majority in the 2018 Telangana Legislative Assembly election. Chandrashekar Rao has been Chief Minister throughout. The leading opposition party has been the Indian National Congress, and other challengers include the Telugu Desam Party and the All India Majlis-e-Ittehadul Muslimeen, Bharatiya Janata Party.after 2018 assembly elections in the year of 2019 formed a new political party named India Janshakti Party founded by Awadesh Panty ,Nilesh takhar from uttarpradesh and Telangana Activist and contested independent Karimnagar assembly 2018 candidate (Pot symbol)Bandi Srinivas ,present he was Telangana state President

Main Political Parties 
 Bharat Rashtra Samithi
 Indian National Congress
 Bharatiya Janata Party
 Telugu Desam Party
 All India Majlis-e-Ittehadul Muslimeen
 Communist Party of India (Marxist)
 Communist Party of India
 Telangana Jana Samithi
 All India Forward Bloc
 Bahujan Samaj Party
 Lok Satta Party 
 Jana Sena Party
 YSR Telangana Party
 India Janshakti Party

Footnotes

 Telangana Politics EtG